The Devils Garden of the Grand Staircase–Escalante National Monument (GSENM) in south central Utah, United States, is a protected area featuring hoodoos, natural arches and other sandstone formations. The area is also known as the Devils Garden Outstanding Natural Area within the National Landscape Conservation System.

The formations in the Devils Garden were created, and continue to be shaped, by various weathering and erosional processes. These natural processes have been shaping sandstone layers formed more than 166 million years ago during the Jurassic period's Middle epoch.

The Bureau of Land Management (BLM) administers the Devils Garden and the entire GSENM which is the first national monument assigned to the BLM.

Geography 
To the west of the area are the Straight Cliffs which define the eastern edge of the Kaiparowits Plateau. To the east of the area is the Escalante River whose tributaries have formed many slot canyons. To the north is the Dixie National Forest and to the south are the Hole-in-the-Rock and Lake Powell which are located within the Glen Canyon National Recreation Area.

The Hole-in-the-Rock Road is the main access road to the Devils Garden. After traveling about  along the Hole-in-the-Rock Road there is a road to the right leading to the Devils Garden area. The majority of the interesting sandstone formations are located in a compact area adjacent to the parking lot.

A climate summary and the current weather forecast for the Escalante area are available in the External links section.

Features 

Metate Arch is a slender caprock natural arch located near the center of the Devils Garden, while a thicker arch named Mano Arch is located southeast of Metate Arch. Many hoodoos of varying sizes and shapes are scattered throughout the Devils Garden, with a particular group of four prominent hoodoos, with no official USGS name, being a popular photographic subject.

Metate Arch    
Mano Arch       
Four hoodoos  

There are no marked trails but many well-worn footpaths lead to the most interesting formations. Since the Devils Garden is part of a protected area, visitors must not disturb any plants, animals or the delicate biological soil crust. Climbing on or over the natural arches is not permitted by the BLM.

Facilities 
Picnic tables and toilet facilities are available. Water is not available and there are no other services provided. Primitive camping is allowed at some points along the Hole-in-the-Rock Road but not at the Devils Garden area or parking lot. A free camping permit is required in advance to camp within the national monument.

Geology 
The rock formations of the Escalante area have been designated the Escalante Member of Entrada Sandstone of the San Rafael Group by geologists, and were formed in the Middle Jurassic epoch (166 to 174 million years ago). The Straight Cliffs Formation of the Kaiparowits Plateau to the west of the Devils Garden were formed during the more recent Cretaceous period. Paleontologists are interested in the area because the rock formations were deposited when the dinosaurs roamed the Earth. Many dinosaur fossils and tracks have been discovered by scientists working within the boundaries of the GSENM.

The natural arches and other formations were created, and continue to be shaped, by the natural processes of weathering and erosion. Some of the rock layers are composed of a harder caprock material which resists the effects of weathering and erosion. Those caprock layers will remain intact much longer than other less resistant layers which weather and erode away below and around them leaving behind the current arches and hoodoos. Cycles of heat and cold, precipitation, ice, wind and gravity all play a part in the creation of the formations.

Daily extreme temperature variations create fractures by repeated expansion and contraction of the rock in a process called thermal stress weathering. The thermal stresses can cause deep cracks that split the rock into separate pieces in an erosional process called thermal exfoliation. Precipitation causes dissolution of the fine crystalline grains that bind the larger particles together, which is known as chemical weathering. Freezing water expands in fractures making them wider and deeper in a process called frost weathering. Gravity exerts a constant downward force that creates new fractures and separates the formations along existing fractures in a process called stress relief exfoliation. High speed winds remove any loose grains from the formations and wind-borne particulates sandblast the surfaces making them smoother.

Wilderness 
The Devils Garden is also known as a Wilderness Study Area for the purpose of possible wilderness designation; however, wilderness status was not recommended by the BLM's District Manager in an Instant Study Area report submitted to the U.S. Congress in 1991. One of the stated reasons was that the existing roads, parking lot, picnic tables and toilet facilities are all in close proximity to the natural area. A second reason was the likelihood of several groups of people converging at the same time around the main formations of the site, which are located in a 10-acre area adjacent to the parking lot (1.6% of the total designated area of 640 acres). Both of those reasons diminish the wilderness experience of solitude in a remote natural setting.

The Devils Garden remains undeclared as a wilderness area but also remains on a list of BLM Wilderness Study Areas compiled in December 2010.

See also 

Major sections of the Grand Staircase–Escalante National Monument:
 Grand Staircase, west
 Canyons of the Escalante, east
 Kaiparowits Plateau, central

Roads and features:
 Utah Scenic Byway 12
 Hole-in-the-Rock Road
 Hole-in-the-Rock formation

Notable explorers:
 Silvestre Vélez de Escalante, name origin of city, river, and monument
 Domínguez–Escalante expedition, skirted but did not enter the monument area in 1776
 San Juan Expedition, traveled through the monument in 1879–80
 Everett Ruess, a young solo explorer of the Escalante Canyons area in 1934

Notes

References

External links 

 Devils Garden – BLM website
 Current weather forecast – National Weather Service
 Monthly Climate Summary – Western Regional Climate Center since 1901
 Grand Staircase-Escalante National Monument – BLM website
 Grand Staircase Escalante Partners – "committed to preserving and protecting the vast landscape of Grand Staircase-Escalante National Monument"
 The Natural Arch and Bridge Society – "non-profit society supporting the study, appreciation, and preservation of natural arches and bridges"
 Utah Arches photo gallery – images of arches in Utah

Grand Staircase–Escalante National Monument
Natural arches of Utah
Rock formations of Utah
Sandstone formations of the United States
Landforms of Garfield County, Utah
Erosion landforms
Colorado Plateau
Geologic formations of Utah
Jurassic geology of Utah
Middle Jurassic geology
Protected areas established in 1996
Protected areas of Garfield County, Utah
Bureau of Land Management areas in Utah